William Bates may refer to:

 William Bates, Australian Aboriginal man who is said to have originated the phrase "Always was, always will be [Aboriginal land]" in the 1980s
 William Bates (minister) (1625–1699), English Presbyterian minister
 William Bates (Quaker) (died 1700), founder of Newton Colony, the third English settlement in West New Jersey
 William Bates (academic) (1821–1884), professor of classics in Queen's College, Birmingham; editor of Maclise's Gallery.
 William Bates (Australian politician) (1825–1891), Australian politician in colonial Victoria

 William Bates (cricketer) (1884–1957), English cricketer
 William Bates (physician) (1860–1931), American physician
 William Gelston Bates (1803–1880), Massachusetts state legislator
 William H. Bates (1917–1969), American politician
 Houston Bates (William Houston Bates, born 1991), American football linebacker
 Bill Bates (born 1961), American football player
 William Penn Bates (1879–1956), American football player and coach
 William Bates (Emmerdale), fictional character on ITV soap opera Emmerdale

See also
 Billy Bates (disambiguation)
 USS William H. Bates (SSN-680), a Sturgeon-class attack submarine
 William Bate (disambiguation)